Christiaan "Chris" Gerrit Herman Bruil (born 20 December 1970 in Doetinchem, Gelderland) is a male badminton player from the Netherlands.

Bruil competed in badminton at the 2004 Summer Olympics in mixed doubles with partner Lotte Bruil-Jonathans, who is his wife.  They had a bye in the first round and were defeated by Kim Dong-moon and Ra Kyung-min of Korea in the round of 16. He also participated four years earlier at the 2000 Summer Olympics when he reached the quarter finals in mixed doubles alongside Erica van den Heuvel. They were eventually beaten by Joanne Goode and Simon Archer.

References

External links
 
 
 
 

1970 births
Living people
Dutch male badminton players
Olympic badminton players of the Netherlands
Badminton players at the 2000 Summer Olympics
Badminton players at the 2004 Summer Olympics
People from Doetinchem
Sportspeople from Gelderland
20th-century Dutch people
21st-century Dutch people